Indio High School is a public high school for grades 9–12. It is located in Indio, California and has a current enrollment of about 2,090 students. Its mascot is a Rajah (an Indian prince). The school is part of the Desert Sands Unified School District. Indio High School has one of the largest student pupil populations of any California high school. It once had a  school boundary area until 1985, but still serves all of Indio, as well parts of La Quinta and accepts intradistrict waivers for Coachella residents. Its feeder schools are Indio Middle School and Jefferson Middle School, which are both located in the city.

History
Indio High School was founded in 1958, which makes it the third oldest high school in the Coachella Valley. The school newspaper is called Sandscripts.  School graduates continuing their education at college have recently improved to 75 percent in 2006, up from 23 percent in 1995 . It was the only high school for DSUSD students in the 9th to 12th grade level, until Palm Desert High School opened its doors in 1985/86 and then La Quinta High School in 1994/95 which have a large share of Indio residents who can attend there by school district policy. A new high school, Shadow Hills in the northern half of Indio will decrease the number of students in the 2009/10 school year. In the 2009/10 school year Desert Sands was deciding whether to close the school at the end of the 2009/10 school year, due to low Standardized Test scores. That year the scores went up dramatically and the board instead voted to renovate the school, which was approved. The School was featured in a video for success 101, a course for freshmen entering high school to help them transition from middle to high school. Freshman students, faculty, and teachers of the 2010/11 school year were followed all school year to see how the class had helped them. For the 2011/12 school year the school moved from a six-period day schedule to an eight-period A/B Block schedule. This was done to give the students more electives and also so they would have opportunities to get more credits. On May 1, 2013 at 8:52, there was a fire at the boy's locker room coaches office. Firefighters took out the fire in about a half an hour.

Renovation
The school has begun renovations in late 2011. Phase I of III which included a new administration building, science/business building, a new gymnasium, and a new Performing Arts Center. The new campus was open to all students at the beginning of the second semester during the 2014/2015 school year. Phase II of III officially began in February 2015, with demolishing the old campus. Phase III was completed in January 2018 and included the baseball, softball, and soccer fields, and basketball hard courts.

Clubs and Groups

Anime Club 
JLU (Jesus Loves U) Club
Yearbook
Broadcasting
AVID
Band
California Cadet Corps
Choir
CSF
Drama
Esports Club
Fashion Club
French Club
Interact Club
Spanish Club
ASB
Fellowship of Christian Athletes
National FFA Organization (FFA)
Mock Trial
Renaissance
Senior Studies
Intramural Sports
Pre-Law
Health Academy
Academic Group
GSA (Gay-Straight Alliance)

Athletics

Boys/Girls Basketball
Football
Wrestling
Volleyball
Swimming
Waterpolo
Baseball
Softball
Soccer
Tennis
Marching Band
Golf
Cross Country
Track and Field
Color Guard/Winter Guard
Cheerleading
Dance

Indio High School has won 14 CIF Championships:

Football-1979, 1981
Men's Swimming-1979
Women's Basketball-1984
Men's Tennis-1983, 1985
Women's Tennis-1985
Waterpolo-1977
Women's Volleyball-1983
Wrestling-1983, 1984, 1991, 1992, 1993

Notable alumni
 Guy Baker, U.S. Olympic Waterpolo Coach,
 Jack Blades, musician
 Lincoln A. Castellanos, actor
 Cameron Crowe, screenwriter and director
 Debi Derryberry, voice actress
 Rigoberto González, literary writer
 Oscar Lua, football player
 Vanessa Marcil, actress
 Tom Martin, television writer
 Tony Reagins, Los Angeles Angels of Anaheim former General Manager
 Marco Sanchez, actor
 Ed White, football player

Indio High School in popular culture
Indio High School has been mentioned in the lyrics of songs and has been featured in music videos.

The Desert Sessions song "Winners" contains an audio sample of a man reading out the names from Indio High School. The names listed in the song "Winners" were real Indio High School students. The song "Interpretive Reading," on the same album as "Winners", features a choir singing the school's alma mater song in the background.

There was a hip-hop single titled "Indio Rydaz" on YouTube released by Lil' Tweety, an Indio High School alumni from the class of 2004.

References

High schools in Riverside County, California
Indio, California
Public high schools in California
1958 establishments in California
Educational institutions established in 1958